The 1999 Balearic regional election was held on Sunday, 13 June 1999, to elect the 5th Parliament of the autonomous community of the Balearic Islands. All 59 seats in the Parliament were up for election. The election was held simultaneously with regional elections in twelve other autonomous communities and local elections all throughout Spain, as well as the 1999 European Parliament election.

Overview

Electoral system
The Parliament of the Balearic Islands was the devolved, unicameral legislature of the autonomous community of the Balearic Islands, having legislative power in regional matters as defined by the Spanish Constitution and the Balearic Statute of Autonomy, as well as the ability to vote confidence in or withdraw it from a regional president.

Voting for the Parliament was on the basis of universal suffrage, which comprised all nationals over 18 years of age, registered in the Balearic Islands and in full enjoyment of their political rights. The 59 members of the Parliament of the Balearic Islands were elected using the D'Hondt method and a closed list proportional representation, with an electoral threshold of five percent of valid votes—which included blank ballots—being applied in each constituency. Seats were allocated to constituencies, corresponding to the islands of Mallorca, Menorca, Ibiza and Formentera, with each being allocated a fixed number of seats: 33 for Mallorca, 13 for Menorca, 12 for Ibiza and 1 for Formentera.

The electoral law provided that parties, federations, coalitions and groupings of electors were allowed to present lists of candidates. However, groupings of electors were required to secure the signature of at least 1 percent of the electors registered in the constituency for which they sought election. Electors were barred from signing for more than one list of candidates. Concurrently, parties and federations intending to enter in coalition to take part jointly at an election were required to inform the relevant Electoral Commission within ten days of the election being called.

Election date
The term of the Parliament of the Balearic Islands expired four years after the date of its previous election. Elections to the Parliament were fixed for the fourth Sunday of May every four years. Legal amendments introduced in 1998 allowed for these to be held together with European Parliament elections, provided that they were scheduled for within a four month-timespan. The previous election was held on 28 May 1995, setting the election date for the Parliament concurrently with a European Parliament election on Sunday, 13 June 1999.

The Parliament of the Balearic Islands could not be dissolved before the date of expiry of parliament except in the event of an investiture process failing to elect a regional president within a sixty-day period from the first ballot. In such a case, the Parliament was to be automatically dissolved and a snap election called, with elected deputies merely serving out what remained of their four-year terms.

Election debates

Opinion polls
The table below lists voting intention estimates in reverse chronological order, showing the most recent first and using the dates when the survey fieldwork was done, as opposed to the date of publication. Where the fieldwork dates are unknown, the date of publication is given instead. The highest percentage figure in each polling survey is displayed with its background shaded in the leading party's colour. If a tie ensues, this is applied to the figures with the highest percentages. The "Lead" column on the right shows the percentage-point difference between the parties with the highest percentages in a poll. When available, seat projections determined by the polling organisations are displayed below (or in place of) the percentages in a smaller font; 30 seats were required for an absolute majority in the Parliament of the Balearic Islands.

Results

Overall

Distribution by constituency

Aftermath

See also
Results breakdown of the 1999 Spanish local elections (Balearic Islands)

Notes

References
Opinion poll sources

Other

1999 in the Balearic Islands
Balearic Islands
Regional elections in the Balearic Islands
June 1999 events in Europe